Züsch is a municipality located in Trier-Saarburg county, in the state of Rhineland-Palatinate, Germany. Züsch is located 40 km from Trier, Germany's oldest city. The Frankfurt-Hahn airport is 40 km away.

Neighboring towns/cities
Neuhütten, Damflos, Hermeskeil, Nonnweiler (Saarland), Muhl.

Population 
Population development (to 31. December each year):

Politics 

The town council in Züsch contains twelve members, that were elected on 7 June 2009. It is headed by the town's mayor, Hermann Bernardy.

Town council Group member distribution:

Religion
Despite the towns modest population it has the oldest Evangelical church (built in 1837) in Trier-Saarburg county which traces its roots to the time of the reformation in the second half of the 16th century. The Evangelical church has one of only two Spanish Organs located in Germany. The town also has a Catholic church (St. Antonius of Padua) with a renovated baroque interior and exterior facade.

Schools
The elementary school (grades 1-4) has students from Züsch, Neuhütten, and Muhl who transfer to Hermeskeil (a 10-minute bus ride) starting with the 5th grade.  On the school grounds is a full size sports hall that is used by the school children during the day.  The sports hall is used regularly by the various local clubs (Karate club, Volleyball club, Gymnastics club, etc.) and is also used for various celebrations throughout the year.

Community Center
The community center (recently renovated former guest house Biehl) offers a modern facility suited to host conferences and medium to large family and group celebrations.

References

External links
 zuesch.de

Municipalities in Rhineland-Palatinate
Trier-Saarburg